David Doherty Norrie (born November 30, 1963) is a former American major college and professional football player who is best known for his long career as a college football game analyst for ESPN and ABC.

Norrie attended Jesuit High School in Beaverton, Oregon. He was a four-year letterman in football at UCLA from 1982 to 1985.  As a senior in 1985, he started at quarterback for the Bruins, leading his team to the Pacific-10 Conference championship and a berth in the 1986 Rose Bowl against Iowa.  Norrie was injured in practice a week before the New Years Day game and was forced to sit out the game. During his senior season at UCLA, Norrie led the Pacific-10 Conference in passing.

Norrie was drafted by the Seattle Seahawks in the 1986 NFL Draft and played for the New York Jets in 1987.  After spending the entire preseason on the Jets' roster, Norrie started two games at quarterback for the Jets during the 1987 NFL strike.

Norrie got his start as a college football analyst in 1991, working four years as the UCLA color analyst on radio broadcasts for the Bruins.  In 1995, Norrie entered college football television broadcasting as a game analyst for Fox Sports Net.  He worked four years with the network, announcing Pacific-10 Conference games, as well as occasional game assignments nationally.

For about a decade Norrie worked as a television game analyst for ESPN and ABC, announcing games on fall Saturdays in all of the major college football conferences.  His assignments for ESPN and ABC included Texas-Oklahoma, Michigan-Ohio State, Florida-Florida State, Miami-Florida State, USC-UCLA, Virginia Tech-Miami, the Chik-fil-A Peach Bowl, the Capital One Bowl, the Nokia Sugar Bowl and the Rose Bowl.  Until the fall of 2018, Norrie was the analyst for the ESPN radio game of the week.

References 

1963 births
Living people
American football quarterbacks
College football announcers
New York Jets players
Players of American football from Massachusetts
UCLA Bruins football players
UCLA Bruins football announcers
Jesuit High School (Beaverton, Oregon) alumni
National Football League replacement players